G protein-activated inward rectifier potassium channel 4 (GIRK-4) is a protein that in humans is encoded by the KCNJ5 gene and is a type of G protein-gated ion channel.

Function 

Potassium channels are present in most mammalian cells, where they participate in a wide range of physiologic responses. The protein encoded by this gene is an integral membrane protein and inward-rectifier type potassium channel. The encoded protein, which has a greater tendency to allow potassium to flow into a cell rather than out of a cell, is controlled by G-proteins. It may associate with other G-protein-activated potassium channel subunits to form a heterotetrameric pore-forming complex.

In humans KCNJ5 is mainly expressed in adrenal gland and pituitary, although it is also detected at low levels in pancreas, spleen, lung, heart and brain. Consistent with this expression pattern, mutations in KCNJ5/Kir3.4 can cause familial hyperaldosteronism type III and a type of long QT syndrome.

Interactions 

KCNJ5 has been shown to interact with KCNJ3.

See also 
 G protein-coupled inwardly-rectifying potassium channel
 Inward-rectifier potassium ion channel

References

Further reading

External links 
 
GTEX portal: KCNJ5 expression in human tissue

Ion channels